This page details football records in Slovakia.

Team records

Most championships won

Overall
 8, Slovan Bratislava (1993–94, 1994–95, 1995–96, 1998–99, 2008–09, 2010–11, 2012–13, 2013–14)

Consecutives
 3, ŠK Slovan Bratislava (1993–94, 1994–95, 1995–96)
 3, MŠK Žilina (2001–02, 2002–03, 2003–04)

Most seasons in Slovak Liga
 19, MŠK Žilina
 19, FC Spartak Trnava

Total titles won

References

Records
Slovakia